Jaume Bassó Barberán (19 September 1929 – 20 January 2021) was a Spanish basketball player. He played for Spain from 1950 to 1955.

References

1929 births
2021 deaths
Spanish men's basketball players
Mediterranean Games gold medalists for Spain
Mediterranean Games medalists in basketball
Basketball players at the 1955 Mediterranean Games
1950 FIBA World Championship players